Tremellodendropsis is a genus of clavarioid fungi in the family Tremellodendropsidaceae. Species are distinguished microscopically by having partly septate basidia, a feature that led to their former placement within the Auriculariales or Tremellales. Molecular research, based on cladistic analysis of DNA sequences, has, however, shown that they form a distinct group within the Agaricomycetes.

Species
Tremellodendropsis clavulinoides
Tremellodendropsis flagelliformis
Tremellodendropsis pusio
Tremellodendropsis semivestita
Tremellodendropsis transpusio
Tremellodendropsis tuberosa

References

External links

Agaricomycetes